ARM Baja California (PO-162) is a , constructed by and for the Mexican Navy.

Design and description

Primary armament is a single OTO Melara 76 mm naval gun, with a pair of OTO Melara 12.7 mm remote controlled naval turret Mod. 517 with M2 12.7mm machine guns on each side, and an Oto Melara single 30/SAFS 30 mm cannon aft.

A helipad on the afterdeck has handling capabilities for a variety of helicopters, such as the Panther, Fennec, or the Bolkow Bo 105 Super-5.

References

External links
 Photograph of the Baja California
 Photograph of the Baja California

Baja California
2003 ships